Frye and Chesterman was an American architectural firm formed in 1900 by partners Edward Graham Frye (1870–1942) and Aubrey Chesterman (1874–1937) with offices in Lynchburg, Virginia. In 1913 the firm moved to Roanoke, Virginia.

Edward Frye had an established architectural practice in Lynchburg in the 1890s. 
Aubrey Chesterman was born in Richmond, Virginia, on June 7, 1875. After completing his basic education in Richmond, he studied architecture for five years under Captain M.J. Dimmock, and he worked for Noland and Baskervill in Richmond. .  His son Aubrey Warren Chesterman (d. 1957) was a prominent architect in Long Island, NY.

Frye works 
 Jones House, 456 Rivermont, Lynchburg, Virginia, Queen Anne style
 residence, 465 Rivermont, Lynchburg, Virginia (1894), Queen Anne style
 residence, 471 Rivermont, Lynchburg, Virginia (1894), Queen Anne style
 R. Taylor Gleaves House, 1700 Rivermont Avenue, Lynchburd, Virginia, Queen Anne style

Chesterman works 
 William A. Graves House, 2102 Rivermont Avenue, Lynchburg, Virginia (1901), Georgian Revival style

Frye & Chesterman works 
 Aviary, Lynchburg, Virginia (1902), NRHP 80004309
 Piedmont Club, Lynchburg, Virginia (1902)
 Penn "Wedding Cake House", 1020 Main Street, Danbury, Virginia (1902)
 Farmers and Merchants Bank Building, 106 North Loudoun Street, Winchester, Virginia (c1902), Renaissance Revival style
 Academy of Music, Lynchburg, Virginia (1904), Beaux Arts style, Neoclassical interior, NRHP 69000340
 Carpenter & Boxley Office Building, 507 East Main Street, Clifton Forge, Virginia (1904) (demolished)
 Fire Station, 1210 Rivermont Avenue, Lynchburg, Virginia (1904), classical revival style
 Norfolk & Western Railway Station, Roanoke, Virginia (1904)
 Alleghany Building, 505-511 East Ridgeway Street, Clifton Forge, Virginia (1905)
 Masonic Theater, 510 Main Street, Clifton Forge, Virginia (1905)
 Jones Memorial Library, 434 Rivermont Avenue, Lynchbug, Virginia (1906), NRHP 80004311
 State Capitol Building wings, Richmond, Virginia (1906, associated architects)
 Krise Building, 827 Main Street, Lynchburg, Virginia (1906)
 Charles L. Cocke Memorial Building, Hollins Institute, Hollins, Virginia (1908)
 Gymnasium, Randolph-Macon Woman's College, Lynchburg, Virginia (1909)
 Thurman & Boone Building, Jefferson Street at Church Avenue, Roanoke, Virginia (1914)
 Municipal Building, 216 Campbell Avenue, S. W., Roanoke, Virginia (1915), NRHP 02000978
 City Market Building, Roanoke, Virginia (1922)
 buildings at the Virginia Military Institute, Lexington, Virginia
 Norfolk & Western Railway Company general office, Roanoke, Virginia
 depots for the Norfolk & Western Railway
 Young Men's Christian Association building, Williamson, West Virginia

Gallery

References 

Architecture firms based in Virginia
19th-century American architects
20th-century American architects